Botswana competed in the 1982 Commonwealth Games. They sent athletes in two sports.

Athletics

Men's 200 metres
Pius Kgannyeng
Shepherd Mogapi

Men's 400 metres
Pius Kgannyeng
Joseph Ramotshabi

Men's 800 metres
Temba Mpofu
Joseph Ramotshabi

Men's 4x400 metre relay
Pius Kgannyeng
Shepherd Mogapi
Temba Mpofu
Joseph Ramotshabi

Men's Marathon
Wilson Theleso

Lawn Bowls
Men's Doubles

Men's Fours

Men's Singles

Women's Triples

Sources
 Official results by country

Botswana at the Commonwealth Games
Nations at the 1982 Commonwealth Games
Commonwealth Games